Olsi Gocaj (born 30 September 1989 in Shkodër) is an Albanian footballer who currently plays as a midfielder for Flamurtari in the Albanian Superliga.

References

External links
 Profile – FSHF

1989 births
Living people
Footballers from Shkodër
Albanian footballers
Association football midfielders
Albania under-21 international footballers
KF Vllaznia Shkodër players
KS Kastrioti players
KF Laçi players
Flamurtari Vlorë players
Kategoria Superiore players
Kategoria e Parë players